Mads Priisholm Bertelsen (born 18 December 1994) is a Danish footballer who plays as a defender for Tarup-Paarup IF. In September 2018, he made his debut for the Denmark national team, as the regular squad withdrew following a players' union dispute.

International career

In September 2018, the Danish Football Association and players' union were scheduled to sign a new national team agreement for the players of the Denmark national team prior to a friendly against Slovakia and their opening UEFA Nations League match against Wales. However, a contract dispute arose regarding the commercial rights of the players, resulting in a failure to sign a new agreement. Despite an offer from the squad to extend the previous deal to allow for further negotiations, the DBU instead named an entirely uncapped squad under the temporary management of coach John Jensen to avoid punishment from UEFA for cancelling the matches. The squad consisted of a mixture of players from the Danish 2nd Division and the Denmark Series (the third and fourth tier of Danish football respectively), along with futsal players from the Denmark national futsal team.

On 4 September 2018, Bertelsen was one of 24 players to be named in the replacement squad. The following day, he made his international debut in the friendly match against Slovakia, starting the match before coming off in the 71st minute for Anders Fønss. The match finished as a 0–3 away loss.

Career statistics

International

References

External links
 
 

1994 births
Living people
Danish men's footballers
SfB-Oure FA players
Tarup-Paarup IF players
Denmark international footballers
Association football defenders